Iskitim is a town in Novosibirsk Oblast, Russia, located on the Berd River. Population:

History
In 1717, four villages were documented on the site of the future city: Koinovo, Shipunovo, Chernodyrovo and Vylkovo.

In 1929, deposits of limestone and shale were found in this place, after which a special commission determined the site for the construction of a cement plant.

In 1933, the working settlement of Iskitim was formed, and the following year the cement plant was built.

In 1938, Iskitim received city status.

Administrative and municipal status
Within the framework of administrative divisions, Iskitim serves as the administrative center of Iskitimsky District, even though it is not a part of it. As an administrative division, it is incorporated separately as the Town of Iskitim—an administrative unit with the status equal to that of the districts. As a municipal division, the Town of Iskitim is incorporated as Iskitim Urban Okrug.

Demographics and crime
A large proportion of local population consists of Romani people. The town is also a notorious center of drug trafficking in Siberia.

In 2004–2005,  took place in Iskitim. Romani people were robbed and driven out of their houses, after which the houses were set on fire. For example, on February 14, 2005, about 10 houses were set on fire. In 2005, a gang of arsonists was caught. However, after their arrest, the arsons of Roma houses continued for some time.

Industries
Iskitim is home to the Chernorechenskii Cement Works and a munitions factory.

Notable residents 

Ilya Belous (born 1995), football player

References

Notes

Sources

External links

Official website of Iskitim 
Iskitim Business Directory 

Cities and towns in Novosibirsk Oblast
Populated places on the Berd River